Just Keke was an American talk show hosted by Keke Palmer. The show premiered June 30, 2014, on BET. The show is taped in Los Angeles, California and aired over an initial four-week run. With this series, Palmer was the youngest talk show host in television history.

In April 2014, BET Networks and Telepictures announced that The Keke Palmer Project was ordered to series. In May of the same year, it was announced that Just Keke would premiere on June 30, 2014, and would air Monday through Friday after 106 & Park.

Episodes

References

External links

2010s American television talk shows
2014 American television series debuts
Television series by Warner Bros. Television Studios
BET original programming
English-language television shows
Television series by Telepictures